The Territorial Court of the Northwest Territories is the lower trial court of the Northwest Territories, Canada. It hears cases relating to criminal law and family law.

Judges of the Territorial Court of the Northwest Territories 

 The Honourable Chief Judge Christine Gagnon
 The Honourable Judge Bernadette E. Schmaltz
 The Honourable Judge Robert D. Gorin
The Honourable Judge Garth E. Malakoe

External links
 Territorial Court of the Northwest Territories website

Northwest Territories courts

Northwest_Territories